Adjarabet is an online gambling company based in Georgia. The company is the leading online gambling website in the country. They also have a service in Armenia.

History
Adjarabet was founded in 1998.

In 2013, Adjarabet won the "Sponsor of the Year" award at the Electronauts Music Festival.

In 2016, Adjarabet organized a WSOP Circuit Georgia event. 

In 2017, Adjarabet was shortlisted in the "Rising Star in Sports Betting" category at the SBC Awards. In the same year, the Armenian service for Adjarabet was launched at "adjarabet.am". 

In February 2019, the UK gambling operator Paddy Power Betfair announced the acquisition of a 51% controlling stake in Adjarabet for €116m, with an option to acquire the remaining 49% after three years.

In May 2019, Adjarabet sponsored and helped renew the Georgian version of the TV show What? Where? When?. The show had been kept off air since 2016 despite its huge popularity with the audiences. In the same month, the first ever women's golf tournament was organized in Georgia, which Adjarabet sponsored.

In 2019, Adjarabet became the premier partner of the Premier League translations in Georgia, which are hosted by Adjarasport. In the same year, Adjarabet became the main sponsor of the Georgian arm wrestling national team, which won more than 120 medals that year.

In November 2019, Adjarabet organized Tech Jam 2019 where developer teams worked on projects ranging from e-commerce to blockchain and artificial intelligence. There was also a panel of invited speakers. The festival had a retro-gaming theme with different classic arcade games like Tekken 3 and Mario being showcased alongside a Board game corner. The following year, Adjarabet collaborated with startup Grind Tbilisi Georgia to organize a digital Techfest aTech Restart which involved a hackathon with more than 100 teams participating. The two companies collaborated once again in November to host "Europe-Asia Connect", a massive tech-conference where startups from 35 different European and Asian countries competed with each other.

In December 2019, Adjarabet released the first ever Georgian interactive film Arena in a collaboration with JWT Metro. It has often been compared to Black Mirror: Bandersnatch, but the company claims that it started filming Arena before Bandersnatch was released. This movie was part of the company's responsible gambling initiative.

During the COVID-19 pandemic, Adjarabet donated 500,000 Georgian lari to the government to buy testing equipment.

Adjarabet platform "Initiative" organized an online charity concert with Stephane Mgebrishvili in June 2020, all benefits from the performance went to people who suffered from COVID-19.

In 2020, Adjarabet introduced Betfair Exchange, where one plays against other users and sets one's own odds.

In October 2020, Adjarabet became the general sponsor of the Georgian Basketball Federation for the following two seasons. The company also sponsors the local Amateur Basketball League.

In November 2020, Adjarabet became the betting partner of SBC Digital Summit CIS. The Company's marketing team was also nominated for the "Marketing campaign of the year" award at SBC Awards 2020. In the same month, Adjarabet helped organize ProductTank Tbilisi 2020.

In 2020 Adjarabet introduced its new sportsbook called "This is Sport". The campaign included supporting a number of successful Georgian athletes including the likes of Nino Odzelashvili and Irma Khetsuriani, as well as the Georgia men's national basketball team. 

Adjarabet kicked off 2021 by introducing completely renewed poker on its website. Updates included adding six-plus hold 'em, spin poker, rakebacks and a new interface.

References

Gambling companies established in 1998
Online gambling companies of Georgia (country)
2019 mergers and acquisitions